Joslyn Rose Lyons is an American director, filmmaker, producer, and film and television executive.

Early life 

Joslyn Rose Lyons began college at California College of the Arts where she studied visual arts and finished her degree at University of California, Berkeley in Film Theory.

Film career 

Joslyn Rose Lyons has directed and produced a diverse range of Award-Winning content in film and television for more than a decade, including work with BET, STARZ, Lionsgate, Warner Bros Pics., and Paramount Pictures, SHOWTIME,

Joslyn’s work with BET began at Rap City and extends from producing content such as Hip Hop Chess with RZA and GZA of the Wu-Tang Clan, to Directing the first Music Matters Grammy Showcase Grammy Edition with PJ Morton, Mack Wilds, Mali Music, at the Creative Artists Agency, to producing BET Celebrity Basketball with Nick Cannon, Chris Brown, Trevor Jackson, Jemelle Hill, Angela Yee, and Lil Rel Howery for the BET Awards.

Joslyn is the Impact Producer on Barbara Lee: Speaking Truth to Power featuring Barbara Lee, Alice Walker, Danny Glover, Van Jones, Cory Booker, Alexandria Ocascio-Cortez, (Lionsgate/STARZ). The film won the 2022 NAACP Image Awards for Outstanding Documentary. Teaming up with STARZ #Takethelead initiative on a series of Transparency Talks with Barbara Lee, Deon Taylor, and Derrick Johnson.

For LeBron James’ digital platform UNINTERRUPTED, Joslyn created and executive produced Same Energy, with episodes featuring Marshwan Lynch, and 2 Chainz.

Joslyn has directed and produced music videos that have debuted on MTV, and BET, for artists including Mali Music, Too $hort ft. Dom Kennedy, E-40, Talib Kweli, Chad Hugo (The Neptunes N.E.R.D.) "Frozen Hearts". Vince Staples, Commom, Mahershala Ali, and, Hieroglyohics.

Joslyn is the co-founder of The Museum of Light, a digital content platform curating content with Rafael Casal, Angie Stone, Mila J., Robert Glasper.

Joslyn made her directorial debut with the Hip Hop documentary Soundz of Spirit, (Common, Saul Williams, Cee-Lo, Goapele) which won Best Music Documentary at the New York International. Joslyn has contributed to documentaries including Miss Representation (Oprah Winfrey Network), “And Then They Came" (George Takei), “Agents of Change” (Danny Glover), and “Waging Change” (Jane Fonda).

Joslyn’s first short film stars actor Mahershala Ali, and won best film at the Link TV One Nation, Many Voices Muslim American Film Competition. Joslyn produced and directed Imagine Justice with Common for his Imagine Justice organization, which is dedicated to empowering communities and fighting injustice.

Her short film Looking Glass, starring Jallal which was invited to premiere at Sundance London, screening at the Los Angeles Pan African Film Festival, and picked up numerous awards at film festivals including The American Film Awards, and TopShorts Best Female Director.

The Academy of Motion Picture Arts and Sciences invited Joslyn to be a Guest Panelist for their Academy Gold. Joslyn is a topmsix finalist in the Academy Gold Women’s Fellowship.

Joslyn picked up Best Director award at the 7th edition of LA Ind. Women Film Awards for her short film starring Hill Harper and J. Alphonse Nicholson.

In April 2022, it was announced that Joslyn Rose Lyons will be making her feature directorial debut with Shadowbox which she also wrote.

Joslyn Rose Lyons a 2022 top six Academy Gold Fellowship for Women Finalist, from the Academy of Motion Pictures Arts and Sciences. 

As noted in Variety in August 2022, Joslyn is the Director on the Showtime documentary feature based on the life of basketball star Mahmoud Abdul-Rauf, entitled “Stand.” The documentary will premiere in early 2023. The documentary film features exclusive interviews with several basketball and entertainment stars including Stephen Curry, Steve Kerr, Shaquille O’Neal, Jalen Rose, Mahershala Ali and Ice Cube.

Joslyn Rose Lyons is represented by CAA and is a member of the Alliance of Women Directors.

Awards 

 Outstanding Documentary Truth to Power NAACP Image Awards
 Best Music Documentary New York International Independent Film & Video Festival
 Best Female Director, TopShorts
 Best Short film, American Film Awards
 NAACP Image Awards Outstanding Documentary  
 Best Director, 7th edition of LA Independent Women Film Awards, starring Hill Harper and J. Alphonse Nicholson.  
 2022 Academy Gold Fellowship for Women Finalist, The Academy of Motion Pictures Arts and Sciences.

References

External links
Curating the Alchemy of the Artists’ Journey at RESPECT Magazine.

Year of birth missing (living people)
Living people